The Philippine serpent eagle (Spilornis holospilus) is an eagle found in the major islands of the Philippines. It is sometimes treated as a race of the crested serpent eagle (Spilornis cheela). This species is usually found in forest clearings, open woodlands, and sometimes in cultivated lands with scattered trees. It is endemic to the Philippines. The species is found on most part of the major islands, except for Palawan.

Habitat 
It inhabits primary and secondary forest. The bird is often seen soaring over clearings and river valleys.

Diet 
The bird feeds on amphibians, reptiles and other live prey.

Description 

The Philippine serpent eagle is distinguished from other species of serpent eagle by more well-defined spots on the underparts and wings.

References

External links

Philippine serpent eagle — Spilornis holospilus

Philippine serpent eagle
Endemic birds of the Philippines
Philippine serpent eagle
Philippine serpent eagle